Bernard J. McIntyre is an American former state politician who was a Democratic member of the 37th Oklahoma Legislature representing the 73rd district in Tulsa County.  A graduate of Booker T. Washington High School, he was elected to the Oklahoma House of Representatives in a special election December 7, 1971, to fill a vacancy created by the death of representative Ben Hill.

In 1982, McIntyre was elected to the Senate to a district created by legislative reapportionment in a predominantly black area of Tulsa. He ran and was re-elected to a four-year term in that district in 1984. In 1985, McIntyre and Don Ross offered a measure which received legislative approval for a Martin Luther King holiday in Oklahoma. The measure was signed into law by Governor George Nigh.

McIntyre became the chairman of the Senate Banks and Banking Committee in 1986. Later that year, McIntyre was convicted of six cocaine-related offenses and sentenced to five years imprisonment. U.S. District Judge Ralph Thompson of Oklahoma City later modified McIntyre's sentence to two years.

McIntyre returned to Tulsa on July 10, 1987, after serving more than 10 months in a Fort Worth federal prison. In an interview, he said that he would finish his two-year term by living in a Salvation Army halfway House at night and spending his days as a consultant to minority businesses in Tulsa.

Notes

References 

Democratic Party members of the Oklahoma House of Representatives
Oklahoma politicians convicted of crimes
20th-century American politicians